StockTwits is a social media platform designed for sharing ideas between investors, traders, and entrepreneurs. The company was co-founded by Howard Lindzon and Soren Macbeth in 2009. The company received the first Shorty Award in the 2008 finance category. Time magazine listed the company as one of its 2010 "50 best websites." The company was also named one of the "top 10 most innovative companies in finance" in 2012 by FastCompany. In June 2013, StockTwits had 230,000 active members. By mid-2019, that figure had increased to 2 million, and the company premiered free online trading via an iOS app. In 2022, the Stocktwits platform added crypto and equities trading to the platform.

History
The idea for the company came from a 2008 blog post where Lindzon suggested that Twitter would be great for stocks and markets even though he once passed on the opportunity to invest in the company. Lindzon teamed up with Soren Macbeth to form the company in 2009. The company utilized Twitter's application programming interface (API) to integrate StockTwits as its own "highly graphical platform of market news, sentiment and stock-picking tools." StockTwits utilized "cashtags" with the stock ticker symbol, similar to the Twitter hashtag, as a way of indexing people's thoughts and ideas about a company and the stock.

StockTwits received the first Shorty Award in the 2008 finance category.

Incorporation of the company Abnormal Returns in 2010 boosted the content available to StockTwits subscribers.

StockTwits began offering a service in 2011 that allows companies to manage and monitor information within the service. Lindzon says it also allows a company to "monitor discussion about the company."

Time magazine listed StockTwits as one of its 2010 "50 best websites." StockTwits was named one of the "top 10 most innovative companies in finance" in 2012 by FastCompany.

As of June 2013, StockTwits had raised $8.6 million in venture capital but has not yet made a profit. Fifty percent of the company's revenue comes from financial data sold to clients including Bloomberg L.P. and Google. Lindzon believes a "cultural change" is needed for the large financial institutions to embrace this technology and that change may take as long as five years.

In June 2016, StockTwits Inc. announced Ian Rosen, a co-founder of Even Financial and former general manager at MarketWatch, as chief executive officer.

In January 2017, StockTwits Inc. acquired Investing Discovery Platform SparkFin Inc.

In December 2017, Stocktwits announced its redesigned web and mobile sites with a new feature called Discover that provided user with important stock information, curated content and earnings calendars.

In August 2018, Stocktwits announced its launch of Rooms, a product that enables users to create new communities based on shared interests, specific stocks or trends affecting the markets.

In October 2018, Stocktwits announced the launch of its Premium Rooms product at Stocktoberfest West, the company's premier event held in Coronado, California. The new feature as a part of Rooms offers users unprecedented access to exclusive content, concepts, and analysis from top investors on a subscription basis.

In December 2018, Brian Norgard, former head of product at dating app Tinder, joined the board of directors of  StockTwits to help the company expand into new areas of financial technology and media.

In April 2019, Stocktwits announced it would launch a  Stocktwits Trade App, which allowed users to place unlimited free equity trades and featured fractional investments. The app was offered by Stocktwits subsidiary ST Invest LLC, a registered broker-dealer and member of the Financial Industry Regulatory Authority.

In December 2021, Stocktwits raised 30M$ for its seed B funding round and announced its next big moves including a boost in its crypto coverage and plans to launch in India by Q2 in 2022. The series B funding set Stocktwits at a valuation of $210 million.

In February 2022, Stocktwits launched its crypto trading platform.

In July 2022, Stocktwits launched equities trading on its platforms for individual investors.

Use
In 2013, StockTwits had over 230,000 active members; by 2020 that number had increased to 3 million, and by 2021 the homepage dashboard shows 5 million members. Lindzon encourages new traders to spend time on StockTwits learning the language. He says that "You don’t learn Spanish in one day, and you’re not going to learn how to invest in stocks in one day. Treat it like a language." Lindzon coauthored the book The StockTwits Edge: 40 Actionable Trade Set-Ups from Real Market Pros with Philip Pearlman and Ivaylo Ivanoff to assist new users with getting the most out of the service.

StockTwits allows users to communicate to Ticker Streams in real time with the use of cashtags. Users are also able to communicate directly using the "@" symbol before a username, a feature seen on Twitter.

Content featured on StockTwits can also be shared to the StockTwits extended network which includes sites such as Yahoo Finance and CNN Money. Users also have the ability to share content to their personal Twitter, LinkedIn and Facebook accounts.

As of 2012 StockTwits has an open API allowing other sites such as TradingView, LikeAssets and HootSuite to integrate their users with StockTwits.

Controversy
Twitter incorporated the cashtags into their platform in 2012 effectively "hijacking" the StockTwits idea. In response to this announcement, Lindzon blogged that "It's interesting that Twitter has hijacked our creation of $TICKER i.e. $AAPL". He went on to note that "You can hijack a plane but it does not mean you know how to fly it." Lindzon sold all of his Twitter stock in 2012 as a result of this controversy.

References

Further reading

External links
StockTwits website

Android (operating system) software
Companies based in San Diego
Social media companies of the United States
IOS software
Real-time web
Text messaging
Twitter services and applications
Stock traders
Shorty Award winners